Nick Chater is Professor of Behavioural Science at Warwick Business School, who works on rationality and language using a range of theoretical and experimental approaches.

Education
Chater read Psychology at Cambridge University. He first worked at Warwick University in 1996.

Career
Chater is head of WBS's Behavioural Science group, which is the largest of its kind in Europe.

Chater presents the Massive Open On-Line Course (MOOC) The Mind is Flat (https://www.futurelearn.com/courses/the-mind-is-flat).

Chater is a member of the UK Committee on Climate Change.

He was an advisor to the UK government's Behavioural Insights Team.

He is a Fellow of the Cognitive Science Society and the British Academy.

Chater was scientist-in-residence on eight seasons of the Radio 4 series The Human Zoo. (http://www.bbc.co.uk/programmes/b036tbly)

Partial bibliography
Chater has coauthored numerous books on rationality and the human mind.

He published The Mind Is Flat: The Remarkable Shallowness of the Improvising Brain in 2018, in which he describes the human mind as a 'story-generating machine'.

References

Fellows of the Cognitive Science Society
Fellows of the British Academy
British scientists